William Cadogan (-1726), 1st Earl Cadogan, an Irish-born British Army officer, began his active military service during the Williamite War in Ireland in 1689 and ended it with the suppression of the 1715 Jacobite Rebellion. A close associate and confidant of the Duke of Marlborough, he was also a diplomat and  Whig politician who sat in the English and British Houses of Commons from 1705 until 1716, when he was raised to the  peerage as  Baron Cadogan.

A strong supporter of the Hanoverian Succession, he took part in the suppression of the 1715 Jacobite Rebellion and succeeded Marlborough in 1722 as Master-General of the Ordnance and senior army commander.

Early life
Cadogan was born in Ireland around 1671, the son of the barrister Henry Cadogan and his wife Bridget Waller, daughter of the regicide Sir Hardress Waller. His family were Irish Protestants of Welsh descent. William's grandfather William Cadogan served as an officer in Oliver Cromwell's New Model Army.

He was one of five children, including two brothers Ambrose and Charles and two sisters: Frances, who died young, and Penelope, who married Sir Thomas Prendergast, 1st Baronet. The family owned an estate at Liscarton in County Meath. His father served as High Sheriff of the county and also acquired property in County Limerick.

At the age of ten, he was sent to England to be educated at Westminster School, then run by Richard Busby. William's father intended him to take up a law career like himself and, in March 1687, he was accepted as a student at Trinity College, Dublin. By this time he had developed into a tall, well-built young man.

War in Ireland

Midway through his studies, however, the Glorious Revolution took place in England in which the Protestant William of Orange seized the throne from the Catholic James II. In Ireland, the largely Catholic Irish Army remained loyal to James, while Protestants declared their support for William. The Protestants of Ulster formed an Army of the North, in which William Cadogan enlisted as a Cornet of Dragoons.

During 1689 he took part in the defence of Enniskillen which was one of only two places, along with Derry, which held out against the Jacobite Irish Army. Following the relief of Derry and Enniskillen by a large expeditionary force under Percy Kirke, Cadogan served with the Williamite troops for the remainder of the Irish War.

He was present at Dundalk Camp during the autumn of 1689, when the Army suffered large casualties from sickness. The following year he served at the Battle of the Boyne a major victory in which William III personally led his forces to victory over the Jacobites, leading to the capture of Dublin.

Later in the same year, he took part in the Siege of Cork where he first served with Marlborough, then an Earl. It appears that it was during this action that Cadogan, although only a junior officer, attracted the attention of his future commander by his conduct. 

Following the climatic victory at the Siege of Limerick in 1691 he continued to serve in Ireland for three years having decided to become a professional soldier rather than return to his law studies. In 1694, he purchased a Captaincy in Erle's Regiment, which was then based in Flanders as part of the Nine Years' War with France.

In 1695, he took part in the Siege of Namur, an important Grand Alliance victory. Following the Peace of Ryswick he returned to Ireland, where in 1698 he became a major of the Inniskilling Dragoons.

War of the Spanish Succession

Appointment
In June 1701, Cadogan was selected as Quartermaster General to Marlborough on the latter's appointment to command the British contingent in the Low Countries. Marlborough had been impressed by Cadogan's administrative skills and his courage and the Siege of Cork a decade before. He had Cadogan promoted to Colonel, over the heads of more experienced officers. In July 1701 he accompanied both Marlborough and King William to Holland.

Britain had not yet officially entered the war, although military preparations were underway. He learnt to speak Dutch at this time, having already mastered French. During his time in Amsterdam, he fell in love with a Dutch heiress named Margaretta Munter. He married her two years later.

War broke out in 1702, following the accession of Queen Anne to the throne. Cadogan was made Marlborough's chief of staff, soon becoming a trusted figure alongside other intimates including the General's brother Charles Churchill, military secretary Adam de Cardonnel and the artillery commander Colonel Holcroft Blood. He also worked with the Dutch political representative Anthonie Heinsius. Cadogan soon demonstrated a flair for logistics and administration. He also came to head the extensive intelligence-gathering operations.

In early 1704 while travelling back to England, carrying important documents, his ship was attacked by a French Privateer. Fearing the seizure of his secret papers, he threw them over the side into the sea. However, his ship managed to get away and safely into harbour. While in London he had an audience with Queen Anne.

Blenheim

During the campaign of 1704, he was one of the few entrusted with the truth of Marlborough's march from the Spanish Netherlands to the Danube and played a major role in the organisation of the March to the Danube. He wrote "This march has hardly left me time to eat or sleep".

He fought at the battles of the Schellenberg and Blenheim. Shortly after he was promoted to brigadier general and became Marlborough's chief of staff.

Ramillies

He commanded the army's scouting part which located the French army on the morning of Ramillies, and acted as a senior messenger for Marlborough during the battle, recalling Orkney's British infantry from their diversionary attack on the French right flank to assault the French centre around Ramillies itself.

In August 1706 Cadogan was captured while scouting enemy positions and taken as a prisoner to Tournai. Marlborough was distressed when he heard that he was missing, claiming "I shall not be quiet till I know his fate". Within two days an exchange had been agreed upon, with Cadogan being swapped with a French General captured at Ramillies.

At Oudenarde he commanded the allied advance guard, which established crossings over the River Scheldt. In 1706 he was promoted to major general and commanded the forces which broke through the French left towards the end of the battle.

Malplaquet
In 1709 he was promoted to lieutenant general. He fought at Malplaquet, and was wounded in the neck at the siege of Mons, but quickly recovered. At the end of 1709 Cadogan was appointed as a Lieutenant of the Tower of London. During the breaking of the lines of Ne Plus Ultra, he again commanded the allied advance guard, and established a bridgehead across the lines prior to Marlborough's arrival with the main army.

Exile

After Marlborough's dismissal from his posts at the end of 1711 Cadogan remained with the army, but refused to return with it when Britain withdrew from the war in 1712, going into voluntary exile with the Duke. In doing so he lost his rank, positions and emoluments under the crown. He was strongly opposed to the terms of the Treaty of Utrecht, agreed by the Tory Government, siding with the opposition Whigs who called for "No Peace Without Spain".

During Marlborough's voluntary exile during the last years of Queen Anne's reign, Cadogan accompanied him, and often acted as a go-between to maintain Marlborough's links with Britain.  When the Hanoverian King George I succeeded in 1714, he reinstated Cadogan to his military offices. Marlborough was reappointed commander-in-chief, although as his deputy Cadogan had increasingly to take on much of the Duke's workload.

Cadogan was rewarded with the post of Ambassador to the Dutch Republic. He was tasked with restoring the relationship with Britain's recent ally which had been damaged by the country's sudden withdrawal from the war. Cadogan oversaw negotiations for a fresh treaty which was concluded the following year.

Jacobite Rebellion

In 1715 he replaced the Duke of Argyll in command of the army putting down a Jacobite Rebellion. A major rising had broken out in Autumn 1715 in the Highlands of Scotland. Argyll as the senior Scottish commander led the initial attempts to contain the Jacobites from his position at Stirling Castle. In November Argyll fought an intense but indecisive battle against the Jacobites at the Battle of Sherrifmuir, after which it was decided in London that he was insufficiently committed to the Hanoverian cause.

Cadogan was then sent north by Marlborough to provide effective leadership. He brought with him many of the 6,000 Dutch troops supplied as part of a treaty commitment, whose shipping to Britain he had overseen. During his absence from The Hague, the diplomat Horatio Walpole fulfilled his duties there.

Cadogan found that Argyll remained reluctant to move against the Jacobites due to the wintery conditions. This continued even after James Stuart, who proclaimed himself to be King, arrived near Aberdeen in December.

Argyll and Cadogan worked together for a while, although the Duke no longer enjoyed the confidence of the government in London. Cadogan established better supply lines for the Army, personally took part in scouting operations, and organised the advance on the rebel capital at Perth. Rather than face a siege of the city, the Jacobites withdrew to Dundee. In February 1716, James abandoned the attempt to personally lead the rebellion in Scotland and sailed for the Continent.

Soon afterwards, Argyll resigned and went to London, turning over total command to Cadogan. He was shortly afterwards dismissed from all his military and political roles, amidst allegations that he had Jacobite sympathies. Cadogan's task was to oversee continued military operations across northern Scotland, forcing the leading Clan chiefs to submit.

In April Cadogan declared the rebellion to be over, and returned to London the following month. Marlborough was instrumental in securing him a peerage as a reward for his efforts during the campaign.

Later life

Cadogan was a Whig Member of Parliament for Woodstock from 1705 to 1716. On 21 June 1716, he was made Baron Cadogan of Reading, having recently purchased Caversham Park, Oxfordshire (now Berkshire) near that town. He was also made a Knight of the Thistle and, the following year, a member of the Privy Council. On 8 May 1718 George I made him 1st Earl Cadogan, of Oakley, co. Buckingham, Viscount Caversham, of Caversham, co. Oxford and Earl Cadogan. In later years he also served as Master of the Robes (1714–1726) and governor of the Isle of Wight (1715–1726).

When the Duke of Marlborough died in 1722, Cadogan walked at the head of the procession at his funeral. He succeeded his former commander as Master-General of the Ordnance (1722–1725). However, the Opposition's staunch hostility towards him meant that he had lost any political influence several years before his death on 17 July 1726. Despite his closeness to Marlborough, he was much occupied in his later years with a lawsuit brought against him by Marlborough's widow. He was himself rather litigious by nature, even engaging in a bitter lawsuit against his own sister Penelope over her son's inheritance.

Family
He married Margaret Cecilia Munter in April 1704 at The Hague. They had two daughters: Sarah (born 18 September 1705), who married Charles Lennox, 2nd Duke of Richmond, and Margaret (born 21 February 1707), who married Charles John Bentinck, fourth son of William Bentinck, 1st Earl of Portland. With no male heir the earldom became extinct. His younger brother Charles, who had married Elizabeth Sloane, the daughter of the noted Irish-born physician and landowner Sir Hans Sloane, inherited the barony by special remainder, passing it down through his son.

References

Bibliography
 Szechi, Daniel. 1715: The Great Jacobite Rebellion. Yale University Press, 2006.
 Watson, J.N.P. Marlborough's Shadow: The Life of the First Earl Cadogan. Leo Cooper, 2003.
 Webb, Stephen Saunders. Marlborough's America. Yale University Press, 2013.

External links

|-

|-

|-

1675 births
1726 deaths
Alumni of Trinity College Dublin
British army commanders in the War of the Spanish Succession
Earls Cadogan
Barons Cadogan
Members of the Privy Council of Great Britain
People educated at Westminster School, London
People from Caversham, Reading
People from County Meath
Diplomatic peers
Knights of the Thistle
W
Coldstream Guards officers
Grenadier Guards officers
5th Dragoon Guards officers
Whig members of the pre-1707 English Parliament
English MPs 1705–1707
Ambassadors of Great Britain to the Netherlands
Lieutenants of the Tower of London
Members of the Parliament of Great Britain for English constituencies
British MPs 1707–1708
British MPs 1708–1710
British MPs 1710–1713
British MPs 1713–1715
British MPs 1715–1722
Irish soldiers
Military personnel from County Meath
Williamite military personnel of the Williamite War in Ireland
Ambassadors of Great Britain to the Holy Roman Emperor